"No net loss" is the United States government's overall policy goal regarding wetlands preservation. The goal of the policy is to balance wetland loss due to economic development with wetlands reclamation, mitigation, and restorations efforts, so that the total acreage of wetlands in the country does not decrease, but remains constant or increases. To achieve the objective of no net loss, the federal government utilizes several different environmental policy tools which legally protect wetlands, provide rules and regulations for citizens and corporations interacting with wetlands, and incentives for the preservation and conservation of wetlands. Given the public benefits provided by wetland ecosystem services, such as flood control, nutrient farming, habitat, water filtration, and recreational area, the estimations that over half the acreage of wetlands in the United States has been lost within the last three centuries is of great concern to local, state, and federal agencies as well as the public interest they serve.

Origins
Since the 1950s, over fifty percent of this loss has come from wetlands being transitioned to agricultural lands. Other contributing factors to wetlands loss include but are not limited to development and forestry. 

The policy, which represented compromise between development and conservation, was grounded on the needs to protect the wetlands by creating and restoring the wetlands. The United States is not the only nation interested in the conservation of wetlands: international cooperation exists in the form of the Ramsar Convention on Wetlands.

Definition 
No net loss is a mitigation policy goal aiming to prevent and offset the destruction or degradation of wetlands. Under this bi-partisan policy, wetlands currently in existence are to be conserved if possible. No net loss is achieved through a coordinated effort of:
 wetlands protection
 creation of new wetlands
 restoration, enhancement, and management
 education, research, and information

No net loss policy under past administrations 

"No net loss" of wetlands was first adopted as a national goal under Jimmy Carter's administration in 1977 under the Executive Order 11990. George H. W. Bush’s administration in 1989, after he campaigned on the policy, emphasized three elements on its policy: strengthening the wetland conservation and acquisition measures, revising the delineation manual, improving and streamlining the wetlands regulatory program. All of these measures are aimed at maintaining wetlands quantity and quality of  national wetland resources.

Bill Clinton 
During his presidency, Bill Clinton's administration reiterated the same pledge by endorsing and updating the no net loss policy. The Clinton Administration’s commitment was to increase the fairness and flexibility,  as well as speed of permit issuances over dredged or fill materials into waters as a part of the implementation of the Section 404 of the Clean Water Act. It also aimed to resolve the differences in the delineation of wetlands area. Finally, the administration committed to increasing funding for wetland restoration measures, such as Wetland Reserve Program under the USDA, voluntary wetlands restoration programs, non-regulatory conservation initiatives, and mitigation banks.

George W. Bush 
The administration of George W. Bush endorsed the no net loss goal in December 2002, when it released the National Wetlands Mitigation Action Plan. This plan outlined improvements to be implement in wetland protection and mitigation by the Army Corps of Engineers, the Environmental Protection Agency, the National Oceanic Atmospheric Administration, the Department of the Interior, the Department of Agriculture, and the Federal Highway Administration.  Additional action by the Bush administration includes a push to clarify and redefine wetlands under the Clean Water Act. This proposal, published on January 10, 2003 guided federal agencies to not require Clean Water Act permits for non-navigable and isolated wetlands.

Barack Obama 
Following the lead of the previous three presidential administrations, Barack Obama also pledged his commitment to no net loss. The Obama administration increased funding of the North American Wetlands Conservation Act to ensure no net loss operation, however funding has been cut in the current budget. Obama campaigned to amend the Clean Water Act and to extend the Swampbuster program, however these commitments have yet to be followed-through with. Barack Obama’s administration additionally is working with Congress to amend the Clean Water Act so that isolated wetlands will fall under the Act’s protection.

Policy instruments
In an effort to meet the United States' policy objectives under the International Ramsar Convention and the national goal of no net loss of wetlands, a variety of policy instruments are utilized within and between the federal, state and local spheres as well as the private sector. Due to the fact that 70% of wetlands are located on private lands, cooperation between government agencies and landholders is a critical component of most policy implementation approaches.

Federal

Command and Control Regulation under the Clean Water Act 
Under the Commerce Clause in the United States Constitution, the federal government derives authority to regulate pollution of United States waters if interstate commerce is affected. The Clean Water Act (CWA), in particular §404, regulates discharge into "waters of the United States". Permitting is required under the CWA §404 for activities that dredge or fill in this jurisdiction, which can include wetlands. Under this permitting program, environmental impacts are to be avoided if possible, reduced and mitigated if necessary. Permits are limited to a maximum period of five years and use public notice and comment procedures. While the U.S. Army Corps of Engineers issues the permit, responsibility for enforcement is shared between the U.S. Army Corps of Engineers and the EPA. However, the scope of what constitutes a wetland and thus what falls under CWA command and control regulation has changed over time. Two recent Supreme Court decisions have impacted the definition of wetlands under the Clean Water Act:

Rapanos et ux, et al v. United States (2006) 
 determination of whether or not a wetland falls under the definitions of "water of the United States" was not limitless
 wetlands adjacent to navigable waters are "waters of the United States"
 no clear definition of navigable waters or majority opinion so jurisdiction under the CWA if one of the following two standards is met:
 Justice Kennedy’s Test: a "significant nexus" must be found between the wetland and traditional navigable waters
 Plurality Test: a "continuous surface connection" needs to flow between the wetland and navigable waters

Solid Waste Agency of Northern Cook County (SWANCC) v. United States Army Corps of Engineers (2001)
 rejection of migratory bird habitats to constitute as intrastate waters
 determined the Migratory Bird Rule, under which the Army Corps of Engineers extended jurisdiction for §404 to include migratory bird habitat, was outside the scope of authority granted in the CWA

Other key federal policy instruments

Additional federal policy instruments include private-public sector collaborations such as educational efforts, conservation easement programs, land banking, and numerous voluntary programs.

State
States government tools for addressing wetland protection, include but not limited to:
 police powers to regulate use of water and land
 zoning authority
 land use designation
 benchmarks regulating net gain or loss
 State Wetland Conservation Plans
 wetlands mitigation banking (compensatory mitigation where wetlands credits are acquired through the restoration of wetland areas and can be used or sold through market trading)

Local
Local Wetland Protection 
Local governments tools for addressing wetland protection, include but are not limited to:
 stakeholder involvement
 Local Wetland Strategic Plans (outlining conservation opportunities, research, and wetlands management)
 ordinances regarding protection, zoning and development plans
 local wetlands mitigation banking

Barriers to implementation 
 Political considerations
Interest groups and constituents can lobby or exploit political influence to receive exemptions or change the scope of wetlands policy. Likewise, politicians and bureaucrats may also change the scope of wetlands policy and its implementation in an effort to cater to constituents and generate political goodwill.
 Economic Considerations
opportunity cost associated with foregone agricultural and development use
value of wetlands services such as recreation, flood control, filtration
value wetlands confer on surrounding property through hedonic pricing
there is no consensus on a valuation system for wetlands
 Other considerations
The processes of wetland restoration, including restoring it to its original function and becoming stable enough as a wetland ecosystem, takes many years. Those processes are also very expensive. Based on the study done in the Kentucky Bottomland Forest, the wetland restoration takes forty-two years, particularly the process of 95% of the carbon accumulation that is stored in natural wetland.  Therefore, in achieving the no net loss wetlands policy goal in relation to area, it is often questionable whether those efforts are worth with the expense for the quality.

References

Wetland conservation in the United States